Spain hosted the Eurovision Song Contest 1969 at the Teatro Real in Madrid, after Massiel won the 1968 contest with "La, la, la". TVE internally selected Salomé to represent the country at the contest. The song, "Vivo cantando", was selected through a national final.

Before Eurovision

National final 
The national final took place at the Teatro Balear in Palma de Mallorca from February 20 to 22, hosted by Marisa Medina and Joaquín Prat. Salomé had already been selected as the singer, but the ten candidate songs were performed twice, once by her and once by another performer.

At Eurovision
Salomé was the third to perform in the running order, following the Luxembourg and preceding Monaco. She received 18 points for her performance, tying for first place with France, the Netherlands and the United Kingdom. All four countries were declared joint winners. This was the first time that there was a tie in the Eurovision Song Contest and the first time that a country, Spain, won two years in a row.

Voting

References

1969
Countries in the Eurovision Song Contest 1969
Eurovision